The Sunset Moulding YCRC Challenger was a professional tennis tournament played on outdoor hard courts. It was part of the ATP Challenger Tour. It was held annually at the Yuba City Racquet & Health Club in Yuba City, California, United States, from 2005 to 2009.

Past finals

Singles

Doubles

External links
Official website
ITF Search

ATP Challenger Tour
Hard court tennis tournaments in the United States
Tennis in California
Yuba City, California
2005 establishments in California
Recurring sporting events established in 2005
2009 disestablishments in California
Recurring sporting events disestablished in 2009